Kathleen Daisy Miller (born 1951 in Hamilton, Ontario) is a Canadian writer. She is most noted for her short story collection All Saints, which was a shortlisted finalist for the Rogers Writers' Trust Fiction Prize in 2014.

Educated at the University of Guelph and the University of British Columbia, Miller's first short story "Now, Voyager" won Flare's literary contest in 1981. She published short stories in literary magazines for a number of years, before publishing her debut collection A Litany in Time of Plague in 1994. She followed up with Give Me Your Answer in 1999, which was shortlisted for the Upper Canada Brewing Company Writers' Craft Award, and the essay collection Holy Writ in 2001.

Her debut novel, Brown Dwarf, was published in 2010, and her third short story collection, The Other Voice, followed in 2011.

Her newest short story collection, Late Breaking, was published in 2019 and featured stories based on the art of Alex Colville. It was longlisted for the 2019 Giller Prize.

References

External links

1951 births
20th-century Canadian short story writers
21st-century Canadian short story writers
21st-century Canadian novelists
Canadian women short story writers
Canadian women novelists
University of Guelph alumni
University of British Columbia alumni
Writers from Hamilton, Ontario
Living people
21st-century Canadian women writers
20th-century Canadian women writers